Live i Oslo Spektrum is a live album released on CD, DVD and Blu-ray featuring Norwegian alternative rock band Kaizers Orchestra. It features their concert at Oslo Spektrum in Oslo, Norway on 9 April 2011, the official celebration of Kaizers Orchestra's tenth anniversary. The album was released on 11 November 2011 (coinciding with the release date of their eighth studio album, Violeta Violeta Vol. II, and the stage premiere of their musical, Sonny). The live CD of the same concert, bundled with both releases, omits a certain number of songs due to capacity constraints.

Track listing
Lyrics for all songs are in the Norwegian language. All songs written by Janove Ottesen, except where noted.

DVD/Blu-ray
 Begravelsespolka
 Delikatessen
 Djevelens orkester
 Señor Torpedo
 Veterans klage
 Sigøynerblod
 Resistansen
 Philemon Arthur & The Dung
 Femtakt Filosofi
 Din kjole lukter bensin, mor
 En for orgelet, en for meg
 Diamant til kull
 Psycho under min hatt
 Svarte katter & flosshatter
 Hjerteknuser
 Sju bøtter tårer er nok, Beatrice
 Ompa til du dør
 Bøn fra helvete (Ottesen/Geir Zahl)
 Kontroll på kontinentet
 Maestro
 KGB
 Dieter Meyers Inst.
 Die Polizei

CD
 Djevelens orkester
 Señor Torpedo
 Veterans klage
 Philemon Arthur & The Dung
 Femtakt filosofi
 Din kjole lukter bensin, mor
 En for orgelet, en for meg
 Diamant til kull
 Psycho under min hatt
 Svarte katter & flosshatter
 Hjerteknuser
 Sju bøtter tårer er nok, Beatrice
 Ompa til du dør
 Maestro
 KGB
 Dieter Meyers Inst.
 Die Polizei

References 

Kaizers Orchestra albums
Live video albums
2011 live albums
2011 video albums